Elisabeth Grasser (7 May 1904 – 14 August 2002) was an Austrian fencer. She competed in the women's individual foil event at the 1936 Summer Olympics, finishing eighth.

References

External links
 

1904 births
2002 deaths
Austrian female foil fencers
Olympic fencers of Austria
Fencers at the 1936 Summer Olympics